Belldown's Point was near Cow Head. It had a population of 52 in 1956.

See also
 List of ghost towns in Newfoundland and Labrador

Populated places in Newfoundland and Labrador